Reg Knezacek (born December 27, 1945) was a Canadian politician who served in the Legislative Assembly of Saskatchewan from 1991 to 1995, as a NDP member for the constituency of Saltcoats.

References

Saskatchewan New Democratic Party MLAs
1945 births
Living people
People from Esterhazy, Saskatchewan